The 27th House of Representatives of Puerto Rico was the lower house of the 15th Legislative Assembly of Puerto Rico and met from January 14, 2005, to January 8, 2009. All members were elected in the General Elections of 2004. The House had a majority of members from the New Progressive Party (PNP).

The body was counterparted by the 23rd Senate of Puerto Rico in the upper house.

Leadership

Current membership

References

27
2005 in Puerto Rico
2006 in Puerto Rico
2007 in Puerto Rico
2008 in Puerto Rico
2009 in Puerto Rico